Antti Hanninen (31 March 1873, Heinjoki - 22 November 1957) was a Finnish farmer and lay preacher. He was a member of the Parliament of Finland from 1911 to 1913, representing the Finnish Party.

References

1873 births
1957 deaths
People from Vyborg District
People from Viipuri Province (Grand Duchy of Finland)
Finnish Lutherans
Finnish Party politicians
Members of the Parliament of Finland (1911–13)